Cristian Sorin Calude (born 21 April 1952) is a Romanian-New Zealander
mathematician and computer scientist.

Biography
After graduating from the Vasile Alecsandri National College in Galați, he studied at the University of Bucharest, where he was student of
Grigore C. Moisil and Solomon Marcus. Calude received his Ph.D. in Mathematics from the University of Bucharest under the direction of Solomon Marcus in 1977.

He is currently chair professor at the University of Auckland, New Zealand and also the founding director of the Centre for Discrete Mathematics and Theoretical Computer Science. Visiting professor in many universities in Europe, North and South America, Australasia, South Africa, including Monbusho Visiting Professor, JAIST, 1999 and visiting professor ENS, Paris, 2009, École Polytechnique, Paris, 2011; visiting fellow, Isaac Newton Institute for Mathematical Sciences, 2012; guest professor, Sun Yat-sen University, Guangzhou, China, 2017–2020; visiting fellow ETH Zurich, 2019. Former professor at the University of Bucharest. Calude is author or co-author of more than 270 research articles and 8 books, and is cited by more than 550 authors.
He is known for research in algorithmic information theory, quantum computing, discrete mathematics and the history and philosophy of computation.

In 2017, together with Sanjay Jain, Bakhadyr Khoussainov, Wei Li, and Frank Stephan, he announced an algorithm for deciding parity games in quasipolynomial time. Their result was presented by Bakhadyr Khoussainov at the Symposium on Theory of Computing 2017 and won a Best Paper Award.

Calude was awarded the National Order of Faithful Service in the degree of Knight by the President of Romania, Mr. Klaus Iohannis, in June 2019.

In 2021, together with Sanjay Jain, Bakhadyr Khoussainov, Wei Li, and Frank Stephan, he won the EATCS Nerode Prize for their quasipolynomial time algorithm for deciding parity games.

Distinctions and prizes
"Computing Reviews Award", Association for Computing Machinery, New York City, 1986.
"Gheorghe Lazăr" Mathematics Prize, Romanian Academy, Romania, 1988.
Excellence in Research Award, University of Bucharest, Romania, 2007.
Dean's Award for Excellence in Teaching, University of Auckland, 2007.
Hood Fellow, 2008–2009.
Member of the Academia Europaea, 2008.
Romanian National Order of Faithful Service in the degree of Knight, June 2019.
"EATCS-IPEC Nerode Prize", 2021.

Selected bibliography

Articles
C. S. Calude, S. Jain, B. Khoussainov, W. Li, and F. Stephan. "Deciding parity games in quasi-polynomial time", SIAM Journal on Computing, (2020), STOC17-152—STOC17-188. .
A. A. Abbott, C. S. Calude, M. J. Dinneen, R. Hua. "A hybrid quantum-classical paradigm to mitigate embedding costs in quantum annealing", International Journal of Quantum Information 1950042-40 (2019). .
A. A. Abbott, C. S. Calude, M. J. Dinneen, N. Huang. "Experimentally probing the algorithmic randomness and incomputability of quantum randomness", Physica Scripta, 94 (2019) 045103. .
C. S. Calude, M. Dumitrescu. "A probabilistic anytime algorithm for the Halting Problem", Computability, 7 (2018) 259–271. .
C. S. Calude, L. Staiger. "Liouville numbers, Borel normality and algorithmic randomness", Theory of Computing Systems, First online 27 April 2017. .
C. S. Calude, L. Staiger, F. Stephan. "Finite state incompressible infinite sequences", Information and Computation 247 (2016), 23–36. .
C. S. Calude, G. Longo. "The deluge of spurious correlations in big data", Foundations of Science 22, 3, (2016), 595–612. .
A. Abbott, C. S. Calude, K. Svozil. "A variant of the Kochen-Specker theorem localising value indefiniteness", Journal of Mathematical Physics 56, 102201 (2015), .
C. S. Calude, E. Calude, M. J. Dinneen. "Adiabatic Quantum Computing Challenges", ACM SIGACT News 46,1 (2015), 40–61. .
A. Abbott, C. S. Calude, K. Svozil. "Value-indefinite observables are almost everywhere", Physical Review A 89, 3 (2014), . .
C. S. Calude, M. J. Dinneen, M. Dumitrescu, K. Svozil. "Experimental evidence of quantum randomness incomputability", Physical Review A 82, 022102 (2010), 1–8. .
C. S. Calude, M. A. Stay. "Most programs stop quickly or never halt", Advances in Applied Mathematics, 40 (2008), 295–308. .
C. S. Calude, G. J. Chaitin. "Randomness everywhere", Nature 400, 22 July (1999), 319–320. .

Books
A. Bellow, C. S. Calude, (eds.) Mathematics Almost Everywhere: In Memory of Solomon Marcus, World Scientific, Singapore, 2018. .
M. Burgin, C. S. Calude, (eds.) Information and Complexity World Scientific, Singapore, 2017. .
 C. S. Calude (ed.) The Human Face of Computing, Imperial College Press, London, 2015. 21st Annual Best of Computing, The Notable Books and Articles List for 2016, ACM Computing Reviews, July 2017. .
 C. S. Calude (ed.) Randomness & Complexity, From Leibniz to Chaitin, World Scientific, Singapore, 2007. ,
C. S. Calude. Information and Randomness: An Algorithmic Perspective, 2nd Edition, Revised and Extended, Springer-Verlag, Berlin, 2002. .
C. S. Calude, G. Păun. Computing with Cells and Atoms, Taylor & Francis, London, 2001. .
C. Calude. Theories of Computational Complexity, North-Holland, Amsterdam, 1988. .

Notes

External links

 Cristian Calude at Mathematics Genealogy Project

CDMTCS at the University of Auckland
Cristian S. Calude member page at Academia Europaea
"C. S. Calude" Mathematics Regional Contest, National College "Vasile Alecsandri", Galați, Romania
"Cristian S. Calude 60th Birthday"

1952 births
Living people
People from Galați
University of Bucharest alumni
Romanian mathematicians
20th-century New Zealand mathematicians
21st-century New Zealand mathematicians
Academic staff of the University of Auckland
Members of Academia Europaea
Romanian computer scientists